Sodium azide is the inorganic compound with the formula . This colorless salt is the gas-forming component in legacy car airbag systems. It is used for the preparation of other azide compounds. It is an ionic substance, is highly soluble in water and is very acutely poisonous.

Structure
Sodium azide is an ionic solid. Two crystalline forms are known, rhombohedral and hexagonal. Both adopt layered structures. The azide anion is very similar in each form, being centrosymmetric with N–N distances of 1.18 Å. The  ion has an octahedral geometry. Each azide is linked to six  centers, with three Na–N bonds to each terminal nitrogen center.

Preparation
The common synthesis method is the "Wislicenus process", which proceeds in two steps in liquid ammonia. In the first step, ammonia is converted to sodium amide by metallic sodium:

It is a redox reaction in which metallic sodium gives an electron to a proton of ammonia which is reduced in hydrogen gas. Sodium easily dissolves in liquid ammonia to produce hydrated electrons responsible of the blue color of the resulting liquid. The  and  ions are produced by this reaction. 

The sodium amide is subsequently combined with nitrous oxide:

These reactions are the basis of the industrial route, which produced about 250 tons per year in 2004, with production increasing due to the increased use of airbags.

Laboratory methods
Curtius and Thiele developed another production process, where a nitrite ester is converted to sodium azide using hydrazine. This method is suited for laboratory preparation of sodium azide:

Alternatively the salt can be obtained by the reaction of sodium nitrate with sodium amide.

Chemical reactions 
Treatment of sodium azide with strong acids gives hydrazoic acid, which is also extremely toxic:

Aqueous solutions contain minute amounts of hydrogen azide, the formation of which is described by the following equilibrium:

, K = 10−4.6

Sodium azide can be destroyed by treatment with nitrous acid solution:

Applications

Automobile airbags and aircraft evacuation slides 
Older airbag formulations contained mixtures of oxidizers and sodium azide and other agents including ignitors and accelerants. An electronic controller detonates this mixture during an automobile crash:

The same reaction occurs upon heating the salt to approximately 300 °C. The sodium that is formed is a potential hazard alone and, in automobile airbags, it is converted by reaction with other ingredients, such as potassium nitrate and silica. In the latter case, innocuous sodium silicates are generated. While sodium azide is still used in evacuation slides on modern aircraft, newer-generation automotive air bags contain less sensitive explosives such as nitroguanidine or guanidine nitrate.

Organic and inorganic synthesis
Due to its explosion hazard, sodium azide is of only limited value in industrial-scale organic chemistry. In the laboratory, it is used in organic synthesis to introduce the azide functional group by displacement of halides. The azide functional group can thereafter be converted to an amine by reduction with either  in ethanol or lithium aluminium hydride or a tertiary phosphine, such as triphenylphosphine in the Staudinger reaction, with Raney nickel or with hydrogen sulfide in pyridine.

Sodium azide is a versatile precursor to other inorganic azide compounds, e.g., lead azide and silver azide, which are used in detonators as primary explosives. These azides are significantly more sensitive to premature detonation than sodium azide and thus have limited applications. Lead and silver azide can be made via double displacement reaction with sodium azide and their respective nitrate (most commonly) or acetate salts. Sodium azide can also react with the chloride salts of certain alkaline earth metals in aqueous solution, such as barium chloride or strontium chloride to respectively produce barium azide and strontium azide, which are also relatively sensitive primarily explosive materials. These azides can be recovered from solution through careful desiccation.

Biochemistry and biomedical uses
Sodium azide is a useful probe reagent and a preservative.

In hospitals and laboratories, it is a biocide; it is especially important in bulk reagents and stock solutions which may otherwise support bacterial growth where the sodium azide acts as a bacteriostatic by inhibiting cytochrome oxidase in gram-negative bacteria; however, some gram-positive bacteria (streptococci, pneumococci, lactobacilli) are intrinsically resistant.

Agricultural uses 
It is used in agriculture for pest control of soil-borne pathogens such as Meloidogyne incognita or Helicotylenchus dihystera.

It is also used as a mutagen for crop selection of plants such as rice, barley or oats.

Safety considerations
Sodium azide can be fatally toxic, and even minute amounts can cause symptoms. The toxicity of this compound is comparable to that of soluble alkali cyanides, although no toxicity has been reported from spent airbags.

It produces extrapyramidal symptoms with necrosis of the cerebral cortex, cerebellum, and basal ganglia. Toxicity may also include hypotension, blindness and hepatic necrosis. Sodium azide increases cyclic GMP levels in the brain and liver by activation of guanylate cyclase.

Sodium azide solutions react with metallic ions to precipitate metal azides, which can be shock sensitive and explosive. This should be considered for choosing a non-metallic transport container for sodium azide solutions in the laboratory. This can also create potentially dangerous situations if azide solutions should be directly disposed down the drain into a sanitary sewer system. Metal in the plumbing system could react, forming highly sensitive metal azide crystals which could accumulate over years. Adequate precautions are necessary for the safe and environmentally responsible disposal of azide solution residues.

References

External links
International Chemical Safety Card 0950.
NIOSH Pocket Guide to Chemical Hazards.

Sodium compounds
Azides
Explosive chemicals